Alan Woodward (7 September 1946 – 21 May 2015) was a professional footballer who played in the position of outside right for Sheffield United over a 16-year period between 1962 and 1978.

Woodward or Woody as he was nicknamed, will be best remembered for his powerful shots. He was also a dead-ball specialist, especially effective with corners, and scored directly from them on many occasions. Wearing the No.7 shirt; he possessed pace, power, and skill and was a local lad who, it is often said, missed out on international recognition because of his temperament. He played in the Sheffield United goal to cover for injuries.

His first appearances for Sheffield United came in their two County Cup (a regional competition for teams in South Yorkshire) fixtures of season 1963–64, against Rotherham United in the semi-final and Barnsley in the final. The County Cup competition was won by United 4–3 with Woodward scoring the first goal of the game and the first of his first team career.

His League debut came against Liverpool at Anfield on 7 October 1964 and his first goal came on 31 October against Leeds United at Elland Road. He scored 4 goals (including a penalty) in a 7–0 home victory against Ipswich Town on 27 November 1971. He left United at the start of season 1978–79, his final goal being a penalty against River Plate of Argentina, in order to play for the Tulsa Roughnecks, where he was nicknamed "the Boomer" for his strong, high arching and accurate passes and shots on goal, in the North American Soccer League.

He remains the Blades' leading post-war scorer and made a total of 538 league appearances for United.

Career statistics

References

External links
Profile of Alan Woodward
NASL stats

1946 births
2015 deaths
Footballers from Sheffield
English footballers
Sheffield United F.C. players
North American Soccer League (1968–1984) indoor players
North American Soccer League (1968–1984) players
Tulsa Roughnecks (1978–1984) players
English Football League players
English Football League representative players
Association football wingers
English expatriate footballers
Expatriate soccer players in the United States
English expatriate sportspeople in the United States